"Wait for Me" is a song by the American duo Hall & Oates. It was written by Daryl Hall and produced by David Foster. It was the third single release from their eighth studio album, X-Static (1979).

Record World said that the "dramatic chorus breaks add suspense to the irresistible hook."

Chart performance

References

1979 songs
1979 singles
Hall & Oates songs
Songs written by Daryl Hall
RCA Records singles
Song recordings produced by David Foster